Gustave Crabbe (4 June 1914 – 3 July 1978) was a Belgian basketball player. He competed in the men's tournament at the 1936 Summer Olympics.

References

1914 births
1978 deaths
Belgian men's basketball players
Olympic basketball players of Belgium
Basketball players at the 1936 Summer Olympics
Place of birth missing